Mohamed Fouad Abd El Hamid Hassan (born December 20, 1961) is an Egyptian singer, actor and songwriter. He filmed his first television series "Agla Min Hayaty" in 2010, and hosted the television show "Khush Ala Fo’sh" in 2014.

Filmography 
 Ghawy Hob
 Howa Fi Eih?
 Rehlet Hob
 Esmailia Raieh Gai
 Youm Har Gedan
 Esharet Moror
 America Shika Bika
 El Qalb We Ma Yashak
 Aghla men Hayaty

Discography 
 Fel Sekka (1985)
 Khefet Dammo (1986)
 Hawed (1987)
 Yani (1988)
 Es'aly (1990)
 Mesheena (1992)
 Habina (1993)
 Nehlam (1994)
 Hayran (1996)
 Kamanana (1997)
 El-Hob El-Haqiqy (1998)
 Albi We Rouhi We Omri (1999)
 El-Alb El-Tayeb (2000)
 Keber El-Gharam (2001)
 Rehlet Hob (2001)
 Shareeny (2003)
 Habibi Ya (2005)
 Ghawy Hob (2006)
 Wala Nos Kelma (2007)
 Been Edeak (2010)
 Ghaly (2010)
 Besohola Keda (2010)
 Ben Edeik (2010)
 Ebn Balad (2010)
 Bashabeh 3alek (2011)
 Tameny 3alek (2011)

References 

1961 births
Living people
Singers from Cairo
Egyptian singer-songwriters
Egyptian male film actors
20th-century Egyptian male singers
Singers who perform in Egyptian Arabic
21st-century Egyptian male singers